Dimovo is a town in northwestern Bulgaria, part of Vidin Province. As of December 2009, Dimovo had a population of 1,211 inhabitants.

The town is located in the western Danubian Plain. Until the Liberation of Bulgaria in 1878, it was known as Barzitsa (Бързица) in Bulgarian, but it had the Ottoman name Osmaniye. In 1880, it was renamed to Aleksandrovo after the Bulgarian knyaz Alexander I of Battenberg. It was briefly named Vlaykovo in honour of Todor Vlaykov in 1936, but the name was changed back to honour Alexander as Knyaz Aleksandrovo in the same year. Finally, the modern name of Dimovo was established in 1951, after local partisan Zhivko Puev's nickname, Dimo.

Municipality

References

External links
 Dimovo municipality page at the Vidin Province website 

Towns in Bulgaria
Populated places in Vidin Province